Dr. Poure Puobe VII was a traditional ruler in Ghana and Paramount Chief of Nandom in the Upper East Region. He was the eighth president of the National House of Chiefs and served in an acting capacity in 1999.

References 

Ghanaian leaders
People from Upper East Region

Possibly living people
Year of birth missing